Andrew Bruce Wallace (born 23 April 1968) is an Australian politician who served as the 31st Speaker of the House of Representatives from November 2021 to April 2022. He is a member of the Liberal National Party of Queensland and has been a member of the House of Representatives since the 2016 federal election, representing the Division of Fisher.

Early life
Wallace was born in Melbourne. At the age of 19, he entered a Pallottine monastery in Victoria. He was asked to leave after less than a year when it was judged that he would not be able to fulfil his monastic vows of poverty, chastity and obedience. Dismissed by the rector, he was told, "there's many ways you can serve God, you don't have to be a priest."

His mother organised his apprenticeship as a carpenter, and Wallace eventually started his own building business. Wallace qualified as a barrister in 2000 after studying law at the Queensland University of Technology, subsequently practising in construction law for 16 years prior to his election to parliament.

Politics
Wallace was elected to parliament at the 2016 federal election, succeeding Mal Brough as the Liberal National Party member for the Division of Fisher. He has chaired the standing committees on Infrastructure, Transport and Cities; Social Policy and Legal Affairs; and Corporations and Financial Services.

Wallace was a member of the Speaker's panel since September 2019. Following the resignation of Tony Smith as Speaker of the House of Representatives on 23 November 2021, Wallace was elected as the new Speaker by the House of Representatives 70 votes to 59 against Labor Party member and Second Deputy Speaker Rob Mitchell. Like his predecessor, Wallace said he would maintain the practice of not sitting in the Liberal Party room while he holds the Speaker position. On the first sitting day of the 47th parliament, Wallace was re-nominated to the speakership. He received 56 votes and was defeated by ALP nominee Milton Dick, who received 96 votes.

Political positions
Wallace is reported to be a member of the centre-right faction of the Liberal National Party.

Wallace was initially opposed to same-sex marriage on religious grounds, but later spoke in favour of the Marriage Amendment (Definition and Religious Freedoms) Act 2017. He cited his daughter's coming out and his "legal background" as influential in his change of mind.

In February 2021, Wallace said that Australian banks should create a voluntary code of conduct barring the use of credit cards for online gambling. He has advocated for tougher regulations on big-tech companies to prevent cyber-bullying, as well as restricting children's access to online gambling and pornography platforms through compulsory third-party identification checks.

Personal life
Wallace has four daughters with his wife Leonie. The couple are practising Catholics who "go to church every Sunday." His youngest daughter lives with a disability, as she was born with a segment missing from her chromosome 16.

References

1968 births
Living people
Speakers of the Australian House of Representatives
Liberal National Party of Queensland members of the Parliament of Australia
Members of the Australian House of Representatives for Fisher
Members of the Australian House of Representatives
Australian barristers
21st-century Australian politicians
Australian Roman Catholics